The Moravian Wallachian dialect is a Czech dialect spoken in the Czech Republic, influenced by standard Czech and Slovak, which includes Romanian words from Daco-Romanian such as bača "shepherd", brynza "cheese", domikát "type of dairy", grapa "steep mountain meadow", pirťa "path for sheep", kurnota "horned sheep", košár "fence for sheep", kozub "fireplace", kyrdel "flock", murgaňa/murgaša "dark-wooled sheep", putira/putyra "little", strunga/strunka "garden gate", watra "fire", or žinčica "sheep whey".

For the above reasons Czech specialists hypothize that groups of Romanian shepherds from present-day Romania (Transylvania, Banat) or present-day eastern Serbia, settled in East Moravia at the latest in the 15th–17th centuries.

References

Czech dialects
Romanian diaspora